is a railway station in Itoigawa, Niigata, Japan, operated by the third-sector railway operating companies Ainokaze Toyama Railway and Echigo Tokimeki Railway (ETR).

Lines
Ichiburi Station forms the boundary station for the Ainokaze Toyama Railway Line to the west and Echigo Tokimeki Railway Nihonkai Hisui Line to the east. Although it is the nominal terminal station for the Echigo Tokimeki Railway, many services continue west to terminate at  It is 100.1 kilometers from the starting point of the Ainokaze Toyama Railway Line at Kurikara Station and is 294.5 kilometers from Maibara Station.

Station layout
The station consists of one island platform connected to the station building by a level crossing. The station is unattended.

Platforms

Adjacent stations

History
Ichiburi Station opened on 15 October 1912. With the privatization of Japanese National Railways (JNR) on 1 April 1987, the station came under the control of JR West.

From this date, Ichiburi Station became a boundary station between the Ainokaze Toyama Railway Line of Toyama Prefecture to the west and the Echigo Tokimeki Railway Nihonkai Hisui Line of Niigata Prefecture to the east.

Passenger statistics
In fiscal 2015, the station was used by an average of 56 passengers daily (boarding passengers only).

Surrounding area
Ichiburi Swimming Beach
National Route 8
Site of Ichiburi Barrier

See also
 List of railway stations in Japan

References

External links

Echigo Tokimeki station information 

Railway stations in Niigata Prefecture
Railway stations in Japan opened in 1912
Stations of Echigo Tokimeki Railway
Stations of Ainokaze Toyama Railway
Itoigawa, Niigata